Sophia Lane Poole (1804–1891) was an English orientalist.

She was the estranged wife of Edward Poole and sister of the famous orientalist Edward William Lane, who suggested that she and her sons join him in Egypt so that she could report on the female side of Egypt's gender-segregated society. The result was her book of letters The Englishwoman in Egypt: Letters from Cairo (subtitled written during a residence there in 1842). She wrote that

Like her brother, Poole adopted local customs and dress in order to gain acceptance in Egyptian social circles. An Egyptian acquaintance of Edward Lane wrote that his household consisted of his mother and sister, "[both of whom] always wore the Egyptian dress, and never left the house except heavily swathed and veiled. The Sheykh al-Dessouki, who frequented Lane’s house regularly, never saw their faces." However, Poole herself hated veiling, and writes that she veiled only in order to gain access to harems, bathhouses, and other "women-only" areas.

She died on 6 May 1891 at the home of her eldest son, Reginald Stuart Poole (1822–1895), at the British Museum, and was buried at West Norwood Cemetery. Another son, Edward Stanley Poole (1830–1867), became an Arabic scholar and editor of the Encyclopædia Britannica.

Sophias' brother was Richard James Lane, a distinguished engraver and lithographer. Her other brother, Edward William Lane was an orientalist like her and so were her son Reginald Stuart Poole and her grandson Stanley Lane-Poole who were notable orientalists and archaeologists.

References 

Leila Ahmed "Edward W Lane", Longstaff, London, 1978
 Elizabeth Baigent, ‘Poole, Sophia Lane (1804–1891)’, Oxford Dictionary of National Biography, Oxford University Press, 2004 accessed 12 Oct 2010

1804 births
1891 deaths
19th-century British women writers
19th-century British writers
Burials at West Norwood Cemetery
English orientalists
English travel writers
Women of the Victorian era
British women travel writers
Lane family